The red-mantled saddlebags or red saddlebags (Tramea onusta) is a species of skimmer dragonfly found throughout the eastern United States. It has translucent wings with red veins, and has characteristic dark red blotches at their proximal base, which makes the dragonfly look as if it is carrying saddlebags when flying. The last two bands and the cerci of these dragonflies are black.

Female red-mantled saddlebags typically have bodies that are light brown or pale orange, with lighter white and brown eyes. Males have a distinctive red body color.

References

External links

Red saddlebags at EOL

Libellulidae
Insects described in 1861